José María Martínez (born 3 July 1947) was an Argentine former footballer.

References

1947 births
Living people
Association football midfielders
Argentine footballers
San Lorenzo de Almagro footballers
Sportspeople from Corrientes Province